Eucampima is a genus of moths of the family Erebidae. The genus was described by Wileman and South in 1921.

Species
Eucampima atritoinalis Hampson, 1926
Eucampima coenotype Hampson, 1910
Eucampima griseisigna Wileman & South, 1921
Eucampima poliostidza Hampson, 1926
Eucampima violalis Gaede, 1940

References

Calpinae
Moth genera